Nalini (Devanagari: नलिनी) is a female gender Indian given name, which means "lotus", "goddess Gayatri","mother of Vedas", "sweet nectar", "Amrit", Feminine "lily" in Sanskrit. The name may refer to:

 Nalini Selva (actress) (born 1984), Indian actress
 Nalini Ambady (1959–2013), Indian psychologist
 Nalini Anantharaman (born 1976), French mathematician
 Nalini Bala Devi (1898–1977), Indian writer
 Nalini Balbir (born 1955), French scholar
 Nalini Bekal (born 1954), Indian writer
 Nalini Chatterjee (died 1942), Indian judge
 Nalini Jameela (born 1955), Indian writer
 Nalini Jaywant (1926–2010), Indian actress
 Nalini Joshi (born 1959), Australian mathematician
 Nalini Krishan (born 1977), Fijian actress
 Nalini Malani (born 1946), Indian artist
 Nalini Nadkarni (born 1954), American ecologist
 Nalini Selvaraj (1944–2014), Indian writer
 Nalini Priyadarshni (born 1974) Indian poet
 Nalini Selvan (1882–1953), Indian business
 Nalini Selvarasa (born 1984), Indian scholar, was princess spencer of all nation
 Nalini Singh (born 1945), Indian journalist
 Nalini Singh (author) (born 1977), New Zealand writer
 Nalini Singh (human rights activist), Fiji
 Nalini Negi (born 1990), Indian actress and model

See also

References 

Arabic feminine given names
Hindu given names
Indian unisex given names